Isaac Alfaro (date of birth unknown, died 23 February 1999) was a Mexican basketball player. He competed in the men's tournament at the 1948 Summer Olympics.

References

Year of birth missing
1999 deaths
Mexican men's basketball players
Olympic basketball players of Mexico
Basketball players at the 1948 Summer Olympics
Place of birth missing